Charles II Albert de Longueval, 3rd count of Bucquoy (1607 – 29 March 1663) was a military commander, holder of high office, and nobleman in the Habsburg realms of the Low Countries and Bohemia. He was the son of Charles Bonaventure de Longueval, 2nd Count of Bucquoy and Maria Magdalena, Countess of Biglia.

Family 
He inherited the dominions of his father, Charles I and became 3rd Count of Bucquoy and Lord of Achiet-le-Petit, Vaulx, Puisieux, Gratzen, Rosenberg, Libiegitz, and Farciennes. On 5 February 1634 he married Maria Wilhelmine de Croÿ Solre, daughter of Jean, Count of Croÿ Solre. The couple had thirteen children. He had the castle of Farciennes built in 1637.

Career 
His military and civil offices included hereditary Master of the Hunt of Artois (1621–1659), captain general, grand bailiff and sovereign governor of the County of Hainaut, governor of Valenciennes, general of artillery, and general of the Spanish cavalry in the Low Countries.

He was a knight of the Order of the Golden Fleece (invested Vienna, 1650) and a commander in the Order of Calatrava.

1607 births
1663 deaths
South Netherlandish people of the Thirty Years' War
Knights of the Golden Fleece
Military personnel of the Thirty Years' War
Flemish nobility
Military personnel of the Franco-Spanish War (1635–1659)